West Liberty is an unincorporated community in Vernon Township, Crawford County, Ohio, United States.

History
West Liberty was laid out in 1835.

References

Populated places in Crawford County, Ohio